The 2022 Saville Shoot-Out was held from September 9 to 11 at the Saville Community Sports Centre in Edmonton, Alberta. The event was held in a round robin format with a $24,000 purse.

Jennifer Jones and her team of Karlee Burgess, Mackenzie Zacharias, Lauren Lenentine and Emily Zacharias won the event, capping off a perfect 8–0 weekend by defeating Ontario's Team Rachel Homan, skipped by Tracy Fleury, 5–4 in the event final. The Jones rink opened with a steal of two in the first end which they extended to a three point lead with a steal of one in the fifth. In the seventh, Team Homan tied the score by stealing two points of their own to level the score at four all heading into the final end. There, Jones executed a runback to score the single point and the win. To reach the final, Jones won 9–3 over South Korea's Gim Eun-ji while Homan defeated Alberta's Casey Scheidegger 6–4. Kerry Galusha, Ikue Kitazawa, Serena Gray-Withers and Selina Witschonke rounded out the playoff field.

Teams
The teams are listed as follows:

Round-robin standings 
Final round-robin standings

Round-robin results
All draw times listed in Mountain Time (UTC−06:00).

Draw 1
Friday, September 9, 2:00 pm

Draw 2
Friday, September 9, 7:00 pm

Draw 3
Saturday, September 10, 9:00 am

Draw 4
Saturday, September 10, 2:00 pm

Draw 5
Saturday, September 10, 7:00 pm

Playoffs

Source:

Quarterfinals
Sunday, September 11, 8:00 am

Semifinals
Sunday, September 11, 11:00 am

Final
Sunday, September 11, 3:00 pm

Notes

References

External links
CurlingZone

2022 in Canadian curling
Curling in Alberta
September 2022 sports events in Canada
2022 in Alberta
Edmonton